Comoros Premier League is the top division in Comoros, it was created in 1979. One of the venues is 2,000 capacity Stade Said Mohamed Cheikh.

2021–22 Comoros Premier League

Regional Leagues

Grande Comoros (Ngazidja) League
Alizé Fort 
Aventure Club
Djabal Club
Élan Club 
Étoile des Comores
FC Malé
Hantsindzi 
JAC Mitsoudjé
Ngaya Club
US Ntsaoueni
Volcan Club 
US Zilimadjou

Mohéli (Mwali) League
Arsenal Mlabanda
Belle Lumière
Etoile du Centre
FC Chihouzi
FCN Espoir
Fomboni FC
Nouvel Espoir
Ouragan Club

Anjouan (Nzwani) League
AS Daoueni
Chirazienne OC
Etoile d'Or
FC Atlético de Mutsamudu
Gombessa Sport
JS Bazimini
Komorozine de Domoni
Ngazi Sport
Steal Nouvel FC
Yakélé Sport

Final tournament
The champions of the three regional leagues will take part in the final tournament to determinate the champion.

Previous winners

1979–80 : Coin Nord (Mitsamiouli)
1980–83 : not known
1983–84 : not known
1984–85 : not known
1985–86 : Coin Nord (Mitsamiouli)
1986–89 : not known
1989–90 : Coin Nord (Mitsamiouli)
1990–91 : Étoile du Sud (Foumboni)
1991–92 : Étoile du Sud (Foumboni)
1992–93 : US Zilimadjou (Zilimadjou)
1993–94 : not known
1994–95 : Élan Club (Mitsoudjé)
1995–96 : Élan Club (Mitsoudjé)
1996–97 : not known
1997–98 : US Zilimadjou (Zilimadjou)
1998–99 : Volcan Club (Moroni)
1999–00 : not known
2000–01 : Coin Nord (Mitsamiouli)
2001–02 : Fomboni FC (Mwali)
2002–03 : not known
2003–04 : Élan Club (Mitsoudjé)
2005 : Coin Nord (Mitsamiouli)
2006 : AJSM (Mutsamudu)
2007 : Coin Nord (Mitsamiouli)
2008 : Etoile d'Or (Mirontsy)
2009 : Apache Club (Mitsamiouli)
2010 : Élan Club (Mitsoudjé)
2011 : Coin Nord (Mitsamiouli)
2012 : Djabal Club (Iconi)
2013 : Komorozine de Domoni (Domoni)
2014 : Fomboni FC (Mwali)
2015 : Volcan Club (Moroni)
2016 : Ngaya Club (Mdé)
2017 : Ngaya Club (Mdé)
2018 : Volcan Club (Moroni)
2019 : Fomboni FC (Mwali)
2019–20 : US Zilimadjou (Zilimadjou)
2020–21 : US Zilimadjou (Zilimadjou)
2021–22 : Volcan Club (Moroni)

Performance By Club

See also
 Comoros Cup
 Comoros Super Cup

External links
League at fifa.com
RSSSF competition history

Football leagues in the Comoros
Comoros